Wolfgang Gröbner (11 February 1899 – 20 August 1980) was an Austrian mathematician. His name is best known for the Gröbner basis, used for computations in algebraic geometry. However, the theory of Gröbner bases for polynomial rings was developed by his student Bruno Buchberger in 1965, who named them for Gröbner. Gröbner is also known for the Alekseev-Gröbner formula, which is actually proven by him.

Early life
Gröbner was born in Gossensaß, which at that time was in part of the County of Tyrol of the Austro-Hungarian Empire and is now part of Italy.
 
Gröbner first studied engineering at the University of Technology in Graz, Austria, but switched in 1929 to mathematics.

Career
He wrote his dissertation Ein Beitrag zum Problem der Minimalbasen in 1932 at the University of Vienna; his advisor was Phillip Furtwängler. After his promotion, he did further studies at the University of Göttingen under Emmy Noether, in what is now known as commutative algebra.

Awards
Wilhelm Exner Medal, 1969.

References

1899 births
1980 deaths
20th-century Austrian mathematicians
University of Vienna alumni
Academic staff of the University of Innsbruck
People from Brenner